The Church of Our Lady of Lourdes is a historic parish of the Georgian Greek Catholic Church in the district of Bomonti of the Istanbul district of Şişli in Turkey. , the church is still in use and remains one of the few Georgian Greek Catholic parishes in the world.

It was built in 1861 with the cooperation of the Catholic priest Peter Kharischirashvili, who wished to provide a rite in the Georgian language. In the 1950s, up to 10,000 ethnic Georgians of the Catholic faith lived in Istanbul. After the Istanbul pogrom in 1955 under Adnan Menderes, many Georgians and other Christians emigrated from Turkey. Today the Georgian-Catholic community numbers only 200 to 250 people. As the number of Georgian Catholic Christians in Istanbul has declined, a large part of the church community today consists of ethnic Armenians and ethnic Turkish converts to the Catholic Faith.

See also
Georgian Byzantine-Rite Catholics
Catholic Church in Georgia
Catholic Church in Turkey

References 

Churches completed in 1861
Catholic churches in Istanbul
Georgian Byzantine-Rite Catholics
19th-century churches in Turkey